A tabard is a short coat which was a common item of men's clothing in the Middle Ages, and which has survived to the present day as the distinctive garment of officers of arms.

Tabard may also refer to:

 HMS Tabard (P342), a British submarine
 Tabard, British English for a cobbler apron
 Tabard Gardens, a park in Southwark, London, located on Tabard Street
 Tabard RFC, a rugby union football club based in Radlett, Hertfordshire, UK
 Tabard Street, a street in Southwark, London, named after the former public house
 Tabard Theatre, a former name for the Chiswick Playhouse in London
 The Tabard, a former public house in Southwark, London
 The Tabard, Chiswick, a public house in Chiswick, London
 The Tabard (fraternity), a Dartmouth College Greek organization